Nina Chernova was a Russian Empire silent film actress. She acted the role of Vera Dubrokskaia, the heroine in Yevgeni Bauer's Twilight of a Woman's Soul (1913), making her "the first professional female performer in Russian film".

References

Year of birth missing
19th-century births
Year of death missing
20th-century deaths
Russian silent film actresses
Actresses from the Russian Empire